The Lindauer and Rupert Block is located in Kaukauna, Wisconsin. It was added to the National Register of Historic Places in 1984 for its significance in commerce and architecture.

References

Commercial buildings on the National Register of Historic Places in Wisconsin
Romanesque architecture
Commercial buildings completed in 1895
National Register of Historic Places in Outagamie County, Wisconsin